Connor James Chatham (born December 22, 1994) is an American professional baseball shortstop who is a free agent. He was drafted by the Boston Red Sox in the 2nd round of the 2016 Major League Baseball draft.

Career

Boston Red Sox
Chatham attended American Heritage High School in Plantation, Florida, and Florida Atlantic University, where he played college baseball for the Florida Atlantic Owls. In 2015, he played collegiate summer baseball with the Bourne Braves of the Cape Cod Baseball League. He was drafted 51st overall in the 2016 Major League Baseball (MLB) draft by the Boston Red Sox. He made his professional debut for the GCL Red Sox and was later promoted to the Lowell Spinners, where he hit .259/.319/.426 with four home runs in 108 at bats.

In 2017, Chatham missed a majority of the season due to injury and only had 19 at bats all season. He started the 2018 season with the Class A Greenville Drive, where he batted .307 in 19 games, and was promoted to the Class A-Advanced Salem Red Sox in May. Overall during 2018, Chatham appeared in 95 games, batting .314 with three home runs and 52 RBIs. 

Chatham started the 2019 season with the Double-A Portland Sea Dogs, and was promoted to the Triple-A Pawtucket Red Sox on August 13. Overall during the 2019 season with both teams, Chatham batted .298/.333/.408 with five home runs and 46 RBIs in 110 games. After the season, on October 10, 2019, he was selected for the United States national baseball team in the 2019 WBSC Premier 12. On November 20, 2019, the Red Sox added Chatham to their 40-man roster.

On March 8, 2020, Chatham was optioned to Triple-A Pawtucket. Chatham did not play in a game in 2020 due to the cancellation of the minor league season because of the COVID-19 pandemic.

Philadelphia Phillies
On January 18, 2021, Chatham was traded to the Philadelphia Phillies in exchange for a player to be named later (Victor Santos was sent to the Red Sox as the PTBNL on July 17). On March 28, Chatham was released by the Phillies. On April 2, Chatham re-signed with the Phillies on a new minor league contract. He was assigned to the Triple-A Lehigh Valley IronPigs to begin the year. Chatham played in 50 games in 2021 for Lehigh Valley, hitting .271 with 3 home runs and 23 RBI's. He elected free agency following the season.

Arizona Diamondbacks
On November 21, 2021, Chatham signed a minor league contract with the Arizona Diamondbacks. Chatham played in 3 games for the Triple-A Reno Aces, going 2-for-12 before he was released by the Diamondbacks on April 12, 2022.

References

External links

1994 births
Living people
Baseball players from Fort Lauderdale, Florida
Baseball shortstops
Bourne Braves players
Florida Atlantic Owls baseball players
Greenville Drive players
Gulf Coast Red Sox players
Lowell Spinners players
Pawtucket Red Sox players
Peoria Javelinas players
Portland Sea Dogs players
Salem Red Sox players
United States national baseball team players
2019 WBSC Premier12 players